Graviera is a cheese from Greece produced in various parts of Greece, the main of which are: Crete, Lesbos, Naxos and Amfilochia. It resembles gruyère, a Swiss cheese from whose name "graviera" is derived.

Graviera is Greece's second most popular cheese after feta. Made in wheels, the rind of the hard cheese is marked with the characteristic crisscross pattern of its draining cloth. There are various types of Graviera produced in Greece. Graviera of Crete is made from sheep's milk and ripened for at least five months. It is slightly sweet, with a pleasant burnt caramel flavor. The graviera of Naxos, in contrast, is mostly made of cow's milk (80–100%).

Graviera can be sliced and eaten, fried as saganaki and eaten as a snack, grated and served over pasta dishes, baked in a casserole or used in salads (in cubes or shavings). It is widely available outside Greece, where it can be purchased at large grocery stores, Greek or ethnic markets, and specialty cheese shops, as well as online. Gruyère can be used as a substitute, but graviera is homier.

See also
 List of cheeses

References

Greek cheeses
Sheep's-milk cheeses
Mixed-milk cheeses
Greek products with protected designation of origin
Cheeses with designation of origin protected in the European Union